Matthew Coad (born 9 August 1975) is a New Zealand sprinter. He competed in the men's 200 metres at the 1996 Summer Olympics. Coad holds a 200m best of 20.61 (+1.8m/s), which is currently the fifth fastest 200m time in New Zealand history, as well as a 100m best of 10.44 (+0.9m/s).

References

External links
 

1975 births
Living people
Athletes (track and field) at the 1996 Summer Olympics
New Zealand male sprinters
Olympic athletes of New Zealand
Athletes from Auckland